José Díaz Fuentes (August 6, 1940 – May 30, 2010) was a Spanish sculptor. He attended the Santiago de Compostela School of Arts and Crafts in 1958, and continued his studies at the San Jorge School of Fine Arts in Barcelona in 1964.

1940 births
2010 deaths
Sculptors from Galicia (Spain)
20th-century Spanish sculptors
20th-century Spanish male artists
Spanish male sculptors
21st-century Spanish sculptors
People from Sarria (comarca)
21st-century Spanish male artists